Damien Magee (born 17 November 1945 in Belfast) is a British former racing driver from Northern Ireland.  He participated in two Formula One World Championship Grands Prix, debuting on 8 June 1975. He scored no championship points.

His only World Championship Grand Prix start came in 1975 when he replaced Arturo Merzario at Williams at short notice for the Swedish Grand Prix. The following year he tried to qualify a RAM-entered Brabham at the 1976 French Grand Prix, but missed out.

Complete Formula One World Championship results
(key)

Complete Formula One Non-Championship results
(key)

Sources
Profile at grandprix.com

1945 births
Living people
Sportspeople from Belfast
Racing drivers from Northern Ireland
Formula One drivers from Northern Ireland
Williams Formula One drivers
RAM Racing Formula One drivers
Atlantic Championship drivers